The Ministry of Education, Science, and Technology was a cabinet-level division of the government of South Korea dealt Education and Science affairs of South Korea. It was created on February 29, 2008. This had been split into Ministry of Science, ICT and Future Planning and Ministry of Education.

Government ministries of South Korea
Science and technology in South Korea
Education in South Korea
Educational organizations based in South Korea
South Korea
South Korea
Ministries established in 2008